"Matilda" is a song by British rock band alt-J from their debut studio album An Awesome Wave, released on 10 January 2012 as a digital download. It was released as a split single with "Fitzpleasure" on 24 February as a digital download and on 10" triangle shaped vinyl. It was written by Joe Newman, Gus Unger-Hamilton, Gwilym Sainsbury and Thom Green and produced by Charlie Andrew. The song relates to the movie Léon, specifically the relationship between the main character (a hitman) and a young girl called Mathilda. The band would later release the song "Leon", a tribute to the main character of the film. The cover image is a photograph of Ball's Pyramid.

The song has a YouTube video featuring imagery of human faces which steadily morph so that every so often you are looking at a new face. This video was a neat gimmick as at the time of release "Alt-J" was the shortcut for a YouTube video to rewind 7 seconds which was the perfect amount of time to go from one "finished" facial image to another so you would see a new face each time you pressed it. This no longer is the case as the shortcut is simply "j" and is now a 10 second skip so it no longer syncs up with the video.

Track listing 
Digital download
"Matilda" – 3:48
10" single
"Matilda" – 3:48
"Fitzpleasure" – 3:39
7" single
"Matilda" – 3:48
"Matilda" (Johnson Somerset Radio Mix)
Digital iTunes EP
"Matilda" – 3:48
"Fitzpleasure" – 3:39
"Matilda" (Remix) – 3:49
"Fitzpleasure" (bretonLABS Ghost Remix) – 4:23

Charts

Certifications

Release history

References

2012 singles
2012 songs
Alt-J songs
Songs written by Thom Sonny Green